The northern groove-toothed shrew mouse (Microhydromys richardsoni) is a species of rodent in the family Muridae found in West Papua, Indonesia and Papua New Guinea.

See also
William Bebb Richardson

References

Microhydromys
Rodents of Papua New Guinea
Mammals of Western New Guinea
Mammals described in 1941
Taxonomy articles created by Polbot
Rodents of New Guinea
Taxa named by George Henry Hamilton Tate
Taxa named by Richard Archbold